Warlock was a British magazine published by Penguin Books and game manufacturer Games Workshop between 1984 and 1986. The primary focus of the magazine was fantasy, with emphasis on the Fighting Fantasy adventure gamebook series.

Publication history
The magazine was established by Fighting Fantasy creators Steve Jackson and Ian Livingstone, running for 13 issues from 1984 until December 1986. Jackson and Livingstone were the editors until issue 10 and then editors-in-chief, with Marc Gascoigne as editor. Warlock was published in the United Kingdom, Australia, New Zealand and Japan, where the title had an extended run before ceasing publication in 1997.

Regular features included announcements, cartoons, competitions, interviews, maps of the Fighting Fantasy world, mini-adventures including abbreviated versions of Caverns of the Snow Witch  and House of Hell with different artwork, a monster bestiary (becoming the basis for the Fighting Fantasy title Out of the Pit) and miniature figure tutorials.

Mini-adventures

References

External links
 Warlock at Annarchive

1983 establishments in the United Kingdom
1986 disestablishments in the United Kingdom
Bi-monthly magazines published in the United Kingdom
Quarterly magazines published in the United Kingdom
Defunct magazines published in the United Kingdom
Fighting Fantasy
Games Workshop
Fantasy games
Magazines established in 1983
Magazines disestablished in 1986
Role-playing game magazines